The January 2017 Azaz bombing occurred on 7 January 2017 when a car bomb in front of a courthouse and near a market in the rebel-held city of Azaz, Syria detonated, killing at least 60 people, mostly civilians, and wounding around 50 others. The Islamic State of Iraq and the Levant was suspected and blamed for the attack.

See also
 List of terrorist incidents in January 2017
 5 September 2016 Syria bombings

References

2017 murders in Syria
ISIL terrorist incidents in Syria
January 2017 crimes in Asia
January 2017 events in Syria
Mass murder in 2017
Mass murder in Syria
Suicide bombings in Syria
Terrorist incidents in Syria in 2017
Islamic terrorist incidents in 2017
Attacks on buildings and structures in Syria
Explosions in 2017